Olympic Museum may refer to one of the following:

Museums linked to the Olympic Games:
Olympic Museum, in Lausanne, Switzerland
Australian Gallery of Sport and Olympic Museum, Melbourne, Australia
Juan Antonio Samaranch Olympic and Sports Museum, in Barcelona, Spain
Lake Placid Winter Olympic Museum, in Lake Placid, New York
Norwegian Olympic Museum, in Lillehammer, Norway
Seoul Olympic Museum, in Seoul, South Korea
Thessaloniki Olympic Museum, in Thessaloniki, Greece
British Olympic Museum, is planning to be built in London, Great Britain
New Zealand Olympic Museum, in Wellington New Zealand
Sarajevo Winter Olympics Museum, in Sarajevo, Bosnia and Herzegovina
 Olympic Museum in Cotonou, Benin, belonging to the Comité olympique et sportif béninois,  at the Stade de l'Amitié-Kouhounou
United States Olympic & Paralympic Museum, in Colorado Springs, Colorado

Museums linked to Olympia, Washington, USA:
Olympic Flight Museum, aviation museum located in Olympia, Washington